Mohammad Enad Al-Fayez (born 18 March 1968 in Amman) is a Jordanian politician and former member of the Jordanian Parliament who was fired from the Parliament following his message to Prince Mohammed Bin Salman that requested that he suspend aid to Jordan until more anti-corruption measures were in place.

Early life 
Al-Fayez was born in Amman in 1968 to Sheikh Enad Mohammad Al-Fayez and Sheikha Sultana Bint Mithqal Al-Fayez. His maternal grandfather is Mithqal Pasha Al-Fayez. He is a cousin of former Jordanian Prime Minister Faisal Al-Fayez. He earned a degree in political science from The University of Jordan and completed his master's degree in International Relations in the U.K.

Career 
In 2020 Al-Fayez became an MP on 10 December 2020. He lost a rae against Abdulmunim Ouddat for the position of Speaker of the Lower House, earning 26 out of 115 votes.

In 2023, Al-Fayez urged Crown Prince of Saudi Arabia, Mohammed Bin Salman, to suspend aid to Jordan, claiming that "this aid only goes to a corrupt class that is getting richer at the expense of the proud Jordanian people". After his comments, Al-Fayez resigned his position, despite many Jordanians asking him to stay. On 18 January he was expelled from the Lower House with 92 votes out of 110 supporting this decision, officially for "disfiguring the kingdom's reputation".

Al-Fayez chose to donate his entire salary as an MP, which he was accused of "unjustly receiving financial allocations during his absence from Parliament".

See also 
Al-Fayez
Mohammed Bin Salman
Parliament of Jordan

References 

1968 births
Living people
Mohammad